Wheidson Roberto dos Santos (born 14 October 1994) - known as Recife -  is a Brazilian footballer who plays as a defensive midfielder for Sergipe.

Club career
Recife began his football career with Flamengo, appearing for the club in the 2014 Copa Libertadores. Recife made his Série A debut at 17 July 2014 against Clube Atlético Paranaense in a 1-0 home win. However, he struggled to integrate into Flamengo's first team and was sent out of successive loans to Atlético-GO and Tupi.

References

External links
Recife at ZeroZero

Living people
1994 births
Brazilian footballers
Association football midfielders
Campeonato Brasileiro Série A players
Campeonato Brasileiro Série B players
CR Flamengo footballers
Atlético Clube Goianiense players
Tupi Football Club players
Boa Esporte Clube players
Rio Branco Sport Club players
Madureira Esporte Clube players
Club Sportivo Sergipe players
Sportspeople from Recife